
Gmina Kołbaskowo is a rural gmina (administrative district) in Police County, West Pomeranian Voivodeship, in north-western Poland, on the German border.

The gmina contains part of the protected area called Lower Odra Valley Landscape Park.

Villages
Gmina Kołbaskowo contains the villages and settlements of Barnisław, Będargowo, Bobolin, Kamieniec, Kamionki, Karwowo, Kołbaskowo, Kurów, Moczyły, Ostoja, Pargowo, Przecław, Przylep, Rajkowo, Rosówek, Siadło Dolne, Siadło Górne, Smętowice, Smolęcin, Stobno, Ustowo, Warnik and Warzymice.

Neighbouring gminas
Gmina Kołbaskowo is bordered by the city of Szczecin and by the gminas of Dobra and Gryfino. It also borders Germany.

References
Polish official population figures 2006

Kolbaskowo
Police County